The 1984–85 season was Mansfield Town's 48th season in the Football League and 11th in the Fourth Division they finished in 14th position with 57 points.

Final league table

Results

Football League Fourth Division

FA Cup

League Cup

League Trophy

Squad statistics
 Squad list sourced from

References
General
 Mansfield Town 1984–85 at soccerbase.com (use drop down list to select relevant season)

Specific

Mansfield Town F.C. seasons
Mansfield Town